Lord of Shanghai  is a 2015 Hong Kong television pre-modern period drama produced by Amy Wong for TVB. It premiered on TVB Jade and HD Jade on 26 October 2015 airing every Monday through Sunday during its 9:30–10:30 pm timeslot with a total of 32 episodes.

The drama is the last of TVB's four 2015 grand anniversary dramas to be broadcast.

The drama, set in the 1930s Shanghai tells the story of three powerful business tycoons portrayed by Anthony Wong, Kent Tong, and Wayne Lai. It is based on a true story about three gangsters in the 1930s Shanghai whose names were Du Yuesheng (Kiu Ngo Tin), Huang Jinrong (Chak Kam Tong) and Zhang Xiaolin (Kung Siu San).

Synopsis

In a time when Shanghai was controlled by the merciless warlords, sworn brothers Kiu Ngo Tin (Anthony Wong) and Kung Siu San (Wayne Lai) have to rely on each other. Together, the ruthless Siu San and the cunning Ngo Tin create a world of their own, but in order to stay on top, Ngo Tin has no choice but to leave his past behind completely, including his confidant and true love Ku Siu Lau (Myolie Wu), a Peking opera apprentice.

Ngo Tin gets the attention of casino boss Yiu Gwai Sang (Alice Chan), who recommends him to her husband Kam Tong (Kent Tong), Shanghai's most powerful tycoon. Along with Siu San, Ngo Tin and Kam Tong become legendary figures in Shanghai, dominating all lands of The Bund.

But a single city cannot accommodate three leaders; Siu San (Wayne Lai) and Kam Tong (Kent Tong) enter a battle for power, creating havoc in Shanghai. Ngo Tin (Anthony Wong) uses this opportunity to suppress both of them, becoming the sole leader of China's largest port city, controlling the police and the underground triads on both fronts.

Amidst the glitz and the glamour, Shanghai enters a period of chaos when the Japanese Empire starts making moves to attack the city. To protect his people and the country, Ngo Tin (Anthony Wong) donates his wealth and time to deflect the Japanese. But Siu San (Wayne Lai), in an attempt to save himself, becomes a traitor and works for the Japanese army. For his people, Ngo Tin (Anthony Wong) has no choice but to forsake his family loyalty, and destroy everyone in his way.

Cast

Main cast

Supporting Cast

Development and production
n August 2013, a press conference was held by TVB announcing future drama collaborations with veteran Hong Kong actor Anthony Wong in order to boost sagging ratings and appease viewers complaints of poorly produced dramas.

Anthony Wong was confirmed to star as the lead for a future drama to be produced by Amy Wong in January 2014. Wong specifically chose to star in an Amy Wong production because during Wong's early years as a struggle actor producer Amy Wong gave him his big break when she helped him get signed to TVB.

Aimee Chan was the first TVB artiste announced to be starring with Wong in an upcoming TVB drama in mid January 2014. However Chan later turned down the role when she became pregnant with her second child. Myolie Wu was later re-cast in the role.

In May 2014, veteran former TVB actor Kent Tong was announced with Wayne Lai, Ron Ng and Pierre Ngo to be part of the main cast. The drama would be Tong's first TVB drama in 30 years.

The rest of the main cast (Myolie Wu, Louisa So, Kenneth Ma, and Natalie Tong) were introduced during a press conference held on 3 June 2014.

The costume fitting ceremony was held on 19 June 2014 at Tseung Kwan O TVB City Studio One Common Room at 12:30 pm.

The blessing ceremony took place on 29 July 2014 at 3:30 pm Tseung Kwan O TVB City Studio One.

Filming took place from June till November 2014 on location in Hong Kong and Shanghai, China.

Filming on location in Shanghai began in mid-September till end of November 2014. Wong had initially refused to film when in Shanghai due to poor living conditions TVB provided and refusing to provide separate living quarters for his female assistant. After TVB discussed the issue with Wong's management company Emperor Entertainment Group, his management company agreed to pay the cost difference of upping Wong to a better hotel and paying travel expenses for his assistant.

Lord of Shanghai is Myolie Wu and Ron Ng's last collaboration with TVB as Wu choose not to renew her contract with TVB in order to prepare for her upcoming marriage to boyfriend Phillip Lee and Ng's contract was not renewed and still in discussion when it expired due to Ng's father's death.

A promo image of Lord of Shanghai was featured in TVB's 2015 calendar for the month of November, released in October 2014.

In March 2015, Lord of Shanghai was one of ten TVB dramas previewed at FILMART 2015.

During the time when Kenneth Ma was portraying the younger version of Kiu Ngo Tin his was dubbed by Maxwell Hui to make his voice sound more like the voice of Anthony Wong.

Viewership ratings

International broadcast

Awards and nominations

References

External links
TVB.com Lord of Shanghai – Official Website 

TVB dramas
2015 Hong Kong television series debuts
2015 Hong Kong television series endings
Hong Kong drama television series
Television series set in the 1930s
World War II television drama series
Second Sino-Japanese War television drama series
Television shows set in Shanghai